Yes to Everything is a 2005 album by Canadian alternative rock band 54-40. This was the first 54-40 album recorded with the band's new guitarist, Dave Genn (former guitarist of Matthew Good Band).  The album was recorded at The Warehouse Studio in Vancouver using former Midnight Oil and Matthew Good producer Warne Livesey.

Track listing
 "Easy to Love" – 3:48
 "Can't Get Enough" – 3:58
 "Golden Sun" – 4:35
 "Stop Line" – 6:05
 "This Is Here, This Is Now" – 4:21
 "All About Love" – 3:12
 "Blue Plate Special" – 3:44
 "Beautiful Self" – 3:38
 "Calling You Out" – 3:00
 "Another Kiss" – 3:06
 "On the Road Home" – 3:58

References

2005 albums
54-40 albums
True North Records albums
Albums produced by Warne Livesey